The Bishop of Bath and Wells heads the Church of England Diocese of Bath and Wells in the Province of Canterbury in England.

The present diocese covers the overwhelmingly greater part of the (ceremonial) county of Somerset and a small area of Dorset. The Episcopal seat is located in the Cathedral Church of Saint Andrew in the city of Wells in Somerset.

The bishop is one of two (the other is the Bishop of Durham) who escort the sovereign at the coronation.

The Bishop's residence is The Palace, Wells. In late 2013 the Church Commissioners announced that they were purchasing the Old Rectory, a Grade II-listed building in Croscombe for the Bishop's residence. However this decision was widely opposed, including by the Diocese, and in May 2014 was overturned by a committee of the Archbishops' Council.

History

Somerset originally came under the authority of the Bishop of Sherborne, but Wells became the seat of its own Bishop of Wells from 909. King William Rufus granted Bath to a royal physician, John of Tours, Bishop of Wells and Abbot of Bath, who was permitted to move his episcopal seat for Somerset from Wells to Bath in 1090, thereby becoming the first Bishop of Bath. He planned and began a much larger church as his cathedral, to which was attached a priory, with the bishop's palace beside it.

In 1197 Bishop Savaric FitzGeldewin officially moved his seat to Glastonbury Abbey with the approval of Pope Celestine III. However, the monks there would not accept their new Bishop of Glastonbury and the title of Bishop of Bath and Glastonbury was used until the Glastonbury claim was abandoned in 1219. His successor, Jocelin of Wells, then returned to Bath, again under the title, Bishop of Bath. The official episcopal title became Bishop of Bath and Wells under a Papal ruling of 3 January 1245.

By the 15th century Bath Abbey was badly dilapidated. Oliver King, Bishop of Bath and Wells, decided in 1500 to rebuild it on a smaller scale. The new abbey-church was completed just a few years before Bath Priory was dissolved in 1539. Then Henry VIII considered this new church redundant, and it was offered to the people of Bath to form their parish church; but they did not buy it, and it was stripped of its glass and lead. The last bishop in communion with Rome was deprived in 1559 but the succession of bishops has continued to the present day.

The diocese and the episcopate are today part of the Anglican Communion.

List of bishops

Pre-Reformation bishops

Bishops during the Reformation

Post-Reformation bishops

Assistant bishops
Among those who have served as assistant bishops of the diocese are:
4 October 185210 May 1853 (res.): George Spencer, commissary during Bagot's illness, and former Bishop in Madras
late 1860s (Eden's illness): James Chapman, Coadjutor-Bishop, Rector of Wootton Courtenay, a Prebendary of Wells and former Bishop of Colombo
1891–1900: Charles Bromby, former Bishop of Tasmania (lived at Clifton with his son)
19311942 (d.): Charles de Salis, Archdeacon of Taunton until 1938, and former Bishop of Taunton
19401943 (res.): Edmund Sara, former Coadjutor Bishop of Jamaica and later Assistant Bishop of Hereford
1950–1967 (ret.): Fabian Jackson, Rector of Batcombe and former Bishop of Trinidad
19561973 (ret.): Douglas Wilson, Canon Treasurer of Wells and former Bishop of Trinidad

In popular culture

Television 
Blackadder, BBC historical sitcom, features a fictional bishop played by Ronald Lacey of this title in the second series' fourth episode Money, in which the bishop is portrayed as an obese, blasphemous, self-confessed pervert who eats children.

Monty Python features two skits in which the Bishop of this title is mentioned.

Radio 
Absolute Power, BBC radio comedy features such a Bishop.

Literature 
Neil Gaiman's 2008 work The Graveyard Book features a character named the Bishop of Bath and Wells – he is one of a trio of ghouls who spirit the main character away.

Ralph of Shrewsbury, Bishop of Bath and Wells, appears as a character in the 1994 fantasy novel The Dragon, The Earl and The Troll, by Gordon Dickson.

References

Bibliography

External links
Official Diocese of Bath & Wells Website
Episcopal succession: Wells

 
Christianity in Bath, Somerset
Wells, Somerset
Bath and Wells
Somerset-related lists